Easthorpe is a village in North Yorkshire, England. It is part of the Appleton-le-Street with Easthorpe parish.

Villages in North Yorkshire